The 1984 Trofeo Filippo Caracciolo was the opening round of the 1984 World Endurance Championship. It took place at the Autodromo Nazionale Monza, Italy on 23 April 1984.

Official results
Class winners in bold. Cars failing to complete 75% of the winner's distance marked as Not Classified (NC).

Statistics 
 Pole Position - #2 Rothmans Porsche - 1:35.85
 Fastest Lap - #4 Martini Racing - 1:38.00
 Average Speed -

References 

 
 

Monza
Monza
6 Hours of Monza